Euestola is a genus of longhorn beetles of the subfamily Lamiinae, containing the following species:

 Euestola basalis Martins & Galileo, 1997
 Euestola basidensepunctata Breuning, 1943
 Euestola fasciata Martins & Galileo, 1997
 Euestola lineata Martins & Galileo, 1997
 Euestola obliqua Galileo & Martins, 2004

References

Desmiphorini